4 route du Champ d'Entraînement, also known as the Villa Windsor, is a historic villa in the 16th arrondissement of Paris, within the northwest section of the Bois de Boulogne, close to the southern edge of Neuilly-sur-Seine. The house is owned by the city of Paris and leased to the family of Mohamed Al-Fayed. Until 1986, it was the Paris home of the Duke and Duchess of Windsor.

Early history
Originally named Château Le Bois, the villa is a classical 19th-century building of fourteen rooms, surrounded by a large tree-filled garden. It was built around 1860 and once owned by the Renault family. The French government sequestered the property after World War II, and Charles de Gaulle occupied the house in the late 1940s.

Home of the Duke and Duchess of Windsor
Following Edward VIII's abdication as King-Emperor in 1936, he was created Duke of Windsor by King George VI in 1937. The Duke married Wallis Simpson on 3 June 1937 at the Château de Candé in France, and she became known as the Duchess of Windsor at that point.

The villa at 4 route du Champ d'Entraînement was leased to the Windsors by the city of Paris at a nominal rent from 1952 to 1986. Maison Jansen, the Paris decorating concern, redid the home under the supervision of the Duchess. The Duke and Duchess both died in the house, in 1972 and 1986, respectively.

In 1952, the Windsors bought a country home, the Moulin de la Tuilerie, in Gif-sur-Yvette, southwest of Paris, where they spent most weekends and summer holidays.

Before and after World War II, the Duke and Duchess had lived in a rented villa, the Château de la Croë at Cap d'Antibes on the French Riviera.

Residence of Mohamed Al-Fayed
When the Duchess died in 1986, the house was returned to the city of Paris. Later that year, the London-based Egyptian businessman Mohamed Al-Fayed, the owner of Harrods at that time, signed a fifty-year lease on the villa.

The rent was one million francs per year, subject to the condition that he spend thirty million francs renovating the house. Al-Fayed extensively refurbished and restored what he termed the Villa Windsor, and for his efforts was promoted to an Officier in the Légion d'honneur in 1989. The former valet of the Duke, Sydney Johnson, acted as a curator to the restoration.

Al-Fayed's son Dodi visited the villa with Diana, Princess of Wales, for half an hour on the day before their deaths in 1997.

Sale of the Windsors' possessions
In July 1997, Al-Fayed announced that an auction of the Duke and Duchess of Windsor's possessions from the villa would take place later that year in New York. He had bought the contents of the property for the equivalent of US$4.5 million from the principal beneficiary of the Duchess's estate, the Pasteur Institute. The items to be offered for sale had personal value for the royal family and included the desk at which Edward had abdicated in 1936, a collection of some ten thousand photographs, and a doll given to Edward by his mother, Queen Mary.

Following the deaths of Al-Fayed's son Dodi and Diana, Princess of Wales, the auction was postponed, but it eventually took place in February 1998 at Sotheby's New York, with more than 40,000 items for sale, divided into 3,200 lots. The proceeds from the auction went to the Dodi Fayed International Charitable Foundation and causes associated with the late Princess of Wales. Members of the British royal family were believed to have purchased all items in the sale, though they remained anonymous.

References

Edward VIII
Houses in Paris
Houses completed in the 19th century
Neuilly-sur-Seine
Diana, Princess of Wales
Wallis Simpson